Fearsome may refer to:

Fearsome Creatures of the Lumberwoods, With a Few Desert and Mountain Beasts
Fearsome critters, term from early lumberjack folklore for a variety of mythical beasts
Fearsome Five, fictional group of comic book supervillains from DC Comics
Fearsome Four, college rugby national championship tournament
Fearsome Foursome (American football), title used in reporting American Professional Football
Fearsome Foursome (comics), fictional supervillain group in the Marvel Comics universe

See also
Feersum Endjinn, science fiction novel by Scottish writer Iain M. Banks